Percelle Ascott (born 10 June 1993) is a Zimbabwean-English actor and writer. He is known for his roles in the CBBC series Wizards vs Aliens (2012–2014) and the Netflix series The Innocents (2018). As a trio, Ascott collaborated with Joivan Wade and Dee Kaate on the web comedy Mandem on the Wall (2011–2013), the E4 series Youngers (2013–2014), and the film The Weekend (2016).

Early life and education
Ascott was born in Bulawayo, Zimbabwe and moved to England with his family when he was three where he grew up in Penge, South London. He first discovered acting at the age of 11 through a school production of The Jungle Book. Ascott's drama teacher  at Woodcote High School helped him get into the BRIT School when he was 16. It was here Ascott met his Mandem on the Wall collaborator Joivan Wade.

Career
Ascott made his television debut as Wayne in the 2010 BBC Two television film Excluded and appeared as a guest lead in two episodes of Silent Witness.

In 2010, Ascott and Wade were approached by Glen Murphy of Twist and Pulse to perform a comedy sketch at one of the duo's live shows. Here they met another act Dee Kaate, with whom they created the web series Mandem on the Wall. The trio were then cast in the E4 series Youngers with their Mandem on the Wall characters incorporated into the story. Mandem on the Wall culminated in a live performance at the Hackney Empire in 2015.

From 2012 to 2014, Ascott starred in Russell T Davies and Phil Ford's CBBC science fiction series Wizards vs Aliens as Benny Sherwood, best friend of the main character Tom, who defends wizardkind and Earth against the Nekross. He made his feature film debut as Mike in the 2013 musical Beat Girl. He then had a supporting role as Ben in the drama film X+Y. He reunited with Wade and Kaate for The Weekend and the interactive online sci-fi Genesis.

Ascott starred in the 2018 Netflix supernatural series The Innocents alongside Sorcha Groundsell and Guy Pearce. That same year, he appeared in the Doctor Who episode "The Battle of Ranskoor Av Kolos" and Rapman's web trilogy Shiro's Story with Wade. Ascott played Cleveland in Julian Kostov's The Dare and Jesse in series 3 of the Sky Atlantic police procedural Tin Star.

Ascott has upcoming film roles in I Came By, Inner Bull, and Kukeri.

Filmography

Film

Television

Web

Stage

References

External links 
 
 
 

Living people
1993 births
21st-century Zimbabwean male actors
Black British male actors
English male television actors
English male web series actors
Male actors from London
People educated at the BRIT School
People educated at Woodcote High School
People from Bulawayo
People from Penge
Zimbabwean emigrants to the United Kingdom
Naturalised citizens of the United Kingdom